Deewee, stylized as DEEWEE is a record label founded in 2015 by David and Stephen Dewaele of the band Soulwax. The label operates from a building in Ghent (Belgium) that the Dewaele brothers nickname DEEWEE 001, referring to it as the first item on the label's catalog. The building was designed for the Dewaeles by Belgian architect Glenn Sestig. It houses the recording studio where all releases on the label are written, recorded or mixed.

The Dewaele brothers conceived their label in reaction to the trend of electronic music artists collaborating remotely via file transfer and rarely meeting to work together in the same location. The label initially released music by new young artists, until 2017 when Soulwax started releasing their own music on it as well. Their 2017 album "From DEEWEE" was based on the 'Transient Program For Drums and Machinery' live tour and was recorded live in one take. It won the album of the year award at the 2017 edition of the Music Industry Awards. The duo continued experimenting on the label, featuring an album made entirely with sounds from the legendary EMS Synthi 100 synthesizer and an online TV channel, named DEEWEE TEEVEE.

Artists 
 Soulwax
 Chloë Sevigny
 Charlotte Adigéry
Asa Moto
Klanken
Die Verboten
Laila Sakini
Laima Leyton
Phillipi & Rodrigo
Sworn Virgins
James Righton
Movulango 
Future Sound Of Antwerp
Bolis Pupul
Each Other (Max Pask & Justin Strauss) 
Extra Credit (Marcus Marr, Joe Goddard & Justin Strauss) 
EMS Synthi 100

Discography

Albums 
 DEEWEE 003: Die Verboten - "2007" (2015)
 DEEWEE 022: Soulwax - "From DEEWEE" (2017)
 DEEWEE 027: Soulwax - "Essential" (2018)
 DEEWEE 031: Laima - "Home" (2019)
 DEEWEE 032: Phillipi & Rodrigo - "Paciencia" (2019)
 DEEWEE 034: EMS Synthi 100 - "DEEWEE Sessions vol.01" (2020)
 DEEWEE 036: James Righton - "The Performer" (2020)

Singles 

DEEWEE 002: Klanken - "Drie / Twee" (2015)
DEEWEE 004: Emmanuelle - "Free Hifi Internet" (2015)
DEEWEE 010: Philiipi & Rodrigo - "Karma / Gueto De Gent" (2016)
DEEWEE 011: Asa Moto - "Stay Awake / Wanowan Efem" (2016)
DEEWEE 012: Laila - "The Other Me" (2016)
DEEWEE 014: Bolis Pupul - "Moon Theme / Sun Theme" (2016)
DEEWEE 015: Emmanuelle - "L'Uomo D'Affari / Italove" (2016)
DEEWEE 016: Soulwax Feat. Chloë Sevigny - "Heaven Scent" (2016)
DEEWEE 017: Phillipi & Rodrigo - "Mantra / New Beach" (2016)
DEEWEE 018: Future Sound Of Antwerp - "Tom Cruise, Scientologist" (2016)
DEEWEE 019: Soulwax - "Transient Program For Drums And Machinery (2016)
DEEWEE 020: Bolis Pupul - "Wèi / Teknow" (2017)
DEEWEE 021: Charlotte Adigéry - "Charlotte Adigéry" (2017)
DEEWEE 023: Asa Moto - "Asa Moto" (2017)
DEEWEE 024: Klanken - "Vier / Vijf" (2017)
DEEWEE 025: Soulwax - "Close To Paradise" (2017)
DEEWEE 026: Soulwax - "Is It Always Binary (DEEWEEDUB)" (2017)
DEEWEE 028: Sworn Virgins - "Fifty Dollar Bills" (2018)
DEEWEE 029: Charlotte Adigéry - "Zandoli" (2019)
DEEWEE 030: Asa Moto - "Playtime" (2018)
DEEWEE 033: Phillipi & Rodrigo - "Paciencia (Single)" (2018)
DEEWEE 035: Sworn Virgins - "Lazer Beam" (2019)
DEEWEE 037: Laima - "Disco Pregnancy" (2020)
DEEWEE 039: Phillipi - "Amadurecimento" (2019)
DEEWEE 040: Each Other - "Be Nice To Each Other" (2020)
DEEWEE 043: Extra Credit - "It's Over" (2021)

Compilations 
 DEEWEE 050: "Foundations" (2021)

Other formats 
 DEEWEE 005: "Untold Eivissa" (2015) — Interviews of Ibiza club promoter Faruk Gandji.
DEEWEE 006: "Untold Eivissa" (2015) - Black T-shirt 
DEEWEE 007: "Untold Eivissa" (2015) - White T-shirt 
DEEWEE 008: "Untold Eivissa" (2015) - Black Totebag 
DEEWEE 009: "Untold Eivissa" (2015) - White Totebag 
 DEEWEE 038: Charlotte Adigéry - "Yin-Yang Self-Meditation"— Meditation tape.

External links 
 Official site

References 

Record labels
Belgian companies established in 2015
Companies based in East Flanders